The Ellinjaa Falls is a ledge waterfall that is located on Ellinjaa Creek, on the Atherton Tableland in the North region of Queensland, Australia.

Location and features
The falls are located on Ellinjaa Creek, and are approximately seven kilometers (ten minute drive) from Millaa Millaa. Access to the base of the falls is via a walking track leading from the picnic area and carpark on Theresa Creek Road.

See also

 List of waterfalls of Queensland

References

External links

Waterfalls of Queensland
South East Queensland
Cascade waterfalls